Lieutenant-General Sir Love Parry Jones-Parry KH (28 November 1781 – 23 January 1853) was a British Army officer, politician and later a High Sheriff. He was the son of Thomas Jones, and after his father acquired an estate at Madryn Park from his cousin Margaret Parry in 1807 took Parry as an additional surname.

Biography
Love was educated at Westminster School and Christ Church, Oxford, matriculating in 1799, despite having been offered a scholarship to Trinity College, Cambridge. He became a student at Lincoln's Inn in 1802, was awarded his BA in 1803 and his MA in 1811.

After two years serving as a major with the 90th Regiment of Foot Jones was elected a Member of Parliament for Horsham in 1806. He was re-elected in 1807 but removed on petition, returning to the 90th Regiment of which he became a lieutenant colonel in 1811. He transferred to America as a major with the 103rd Regiment of Foot and served during the War of 1812, including at the Battle of Lundy's Lane with the 1st Militia Brigade as a lieutenant colonel.

He retired in 1815 on half-pay as a lieutenant colonel, and was promoted to colonel in 1825, followed by further promotions to major general and lieutenant general in 1837 and 1846 respectively. He was knighted in 1835 and made a Knight of the Royal Guelphic Order in 1836. In 1840 he was made High Sheriff of Anglesey. He died on 23 January 1853 and was buried on 1 February in Llanbedrog, where his family maintained a crypt. By the time he died he owned all but three farms in the parish of Ceidio.

Personal life
He was married twice, first to Sophia Stevenson in 1806 and secondly to Elizabeth Caldecott on 15 December 1826. From these two marriages he had four daughters and several sons, including Mary and Sir Love Jones-Parry, 1st Baronet.

References

External links 
 

1781 births
1853 deaths
Alumni of Christ Church, Oxford
Cameronians officers
High Sheriffs of Anglesey
Members of the Parliament of the United Kingdom for English constituencies
Members of the Parliament of the United Kingdom for Welsh constituencies
People educated at Westminster School, London
UK MPs 1806–1807
UK MPs 1807–1812
UK MPs 1835–1837
British Army personnel of the War of 1812
British Army lieutenant generals
Members of Parliament for Caernarfon